Hillerella is a monotypic genus of brachiopods belonging to the family Kraussinidae. The only species is Hillerella bisepta.

The species is found in Indo-Pacific waters.

References

Terebratulida
Brachiopod genera
Monotypic brachiopod genera